Growing Up is a sex education film for schools, 23 minutes in length, first shown in April 1971, which was made by Dr Martin Cole. It is now available as part of The Joy of Sex Education DVD and was described by one critic as "the most famous and controversial inclusion", and by Peter Bradshaw of The Guardian as the "undoubted masterpiece of this double-DVD set".

At the time of its release it was said to be "the most explicit and frank film ever made for use in schools", and attracted condemnation by Mary Whitehouse, Lord Longford, Margaret Thatcher and members of the Women's Liberation Movement who all, excepting Thatcher, attended the first public screening. Made two years before its earliest public showing, Cole though soon regretted a traditionalist description of gender roles in the film's opening commentary. The function of women was described as "giving birth to children", while it claimed men were "better at giving birth to ideas", a sequence which the Women's Liberation Movement objected to. There was a version of the film shown to Aston University students earlier for feedback prior to the final version being released. It features scenes rather than drawings of naked people, which included intercourse and masturbation. Teachers and pupils gave it positive feedback, but the absence of a discussion of venereal disease (VD) was noted by sympathetic reviewers.

The film triggered a national controversy;"Educationally speaking, it is a rotten film", Whitehouse said after viewing the film, "which makes children no more than animals." Margaret Thatcher, then secretary of state for education who had sent an advisor to view the film, told the House of Commons on 21 April that she was "very perturbed" at the thought of the film being shown in schools and suggested local education authorities consider it "with extreme caution".

After insisting on a screening, the education authority in Birmingham, where Cole lived, banned the film from being shown in the city's schools. There is no record of the film being shown to school children anywhere by the end of 1971, although it was shown to students at Oxford University.

In 1976 the film was shown to pupils at Milham Ford Girls' School, Oxford with the support of the then headmistress and the majority of the governors. A number of parents and pupils subsequently raised concerns with the National Viewers and Listeners Association.

Further reading
Limond, David (2008) History of Education 37 (3) 409–429 "‘I never imagined that the time would come’: Martin Cole, the Growing Up Controversy and the Limits of School Sex Education in 1970s England"

References

1971 films
Aston University
British documentary films
Documentary films about sexuality
Sex education in the United Kingdom
1970s English-language films
1970s British films